This is a list of all the destinations Mexicana de Aviación served in its entire 89-year history. (all destinations have been terminated as of August 27, 2010)

Mexicana also served dozens more destinations at one point. They served Campeche, Chetumal, Ciudad Victoria, Ixtepec, Tamuín and Tuxpan in the 1950s, Corpus Christi, Texas (CRP) in 1967, Kansas City (MCI), Kingston, Jamaica (KIN) and St. Louis (STL) in 1976, Harlingen, Texas (HRL) in 1979-1981 and Baltimore (BWI), Philadelphia (PHL), Tampa (TPA) and Seattle (SEA) in 1990.

References

Mexicana de Aviación
Lists of airline destinations